The Royal New Zealand Army Medical Corps (RNZAMC) is a corps of the New Zealand Army, the land branch of the New Zealand Defence Force (NZDF). The Medical Corps provides for the medical needs of soldiers, such as diagnosing and treating diseases and injuries. Medical personnel are part of almost all Army exercises and operations, and personnel work in conjunction with personnel from the Royal New Zealand Dental Corps and the Royal New Zealand Nursing Corps.

History 
The New Zealand Medical Corps (NZMC) was established in May 1908 to provide a reserve of medical personnel should that be required in the event of war. After the declaration of war in August 1914, the New Zealand government sent a small contingent of medical staff to Samoa to take over the hospital at Apia. The contingent was made up of four medical officers, two dental surgeons, 67 non-commissioned officers and seven nurses.

As the war progressed and the number of casualties increased, it became apparent that more medical personnel were required to treat them. James Allen, Minister of Defence, offered to send medical personnel to a stationary hospital in Egypt, including eight officers and 50 nurses. New Zealand medical personnel went on to serve in Samoa, Egypt, Palestine, Gallipoli, France, Belgium, Serbia and Great Britain. Among the hospitals serving New Zealand personnel in Great Britain were No. 1 General Hospital, located at Brockenhurst in Hampshire; No. 2 New Zealand General Hospital in Walton-on-Thames; and No. 3 General Hospital at Codford. No. 2 General Hospital came under the control of the New Zealand Expeditionary Force in April 1916, and was located in the requisitioned 15th century Mount Felix estate until mid-1919. There were also another seven military hospitals of various types serving the Expeditionary Force in the UK, France, and Egypt.

As part of the 2nd New Zealand Expeditionary Force, three General Hospitals, three Field Ambulances, and a Convalescent Depot were dispatched to the Middle East (and 1 General Hospital and 5 Field Ambulance to the United Kingdom with the Second Echelon, temporarily) along with the remainder of the force.

On 12 July 1947 (Gazette No. 39/1947) the NZMC was granted a Royal Warrant and became the Royal New Zealand Army Medical Corps (RNZAMC). Queen Elizabeth The Queen Mother was the Colonel-in-Chief from 1977 to 2002.

During the Cold War, the Army maintained hospitals and field ambulances. In 1991, 2 (GH) Field Hospital, tracing its descent from No. 2 General Hospital originally formed at Walton-on-Thames, celebrated its 75th anniversary. The Forward Surgical Team was deployed to East Timor while serving with INTERFET from 1999. The last Field Hospital was reorganised into 2nd Health Support Battalion in the mid-2000s, following an Australian example. The Battalion was located at Linton Military Camp. 
In 2015 the 2nd NZ Health Support Battalion was superseded by the Joint Operational Health Group (JOHG). JOHG, in turn, in 2017 was superseded and the Deployable Health Organisation (DHO) was formed and its Headquarters is based in Linton Camp. The DHO forms an integral part of the Joint Services Group (JSG) which is Headquartered in Trentham Camp.

Director of Medical Services 1st NZEF 1914-1915
Col W. J. Will VD 5 June 1914 – 27 August 1914
Col James R. Purdy CBE, TD 27 August 1914 – 24 July 1915

Director General of Medical Services 1st NZEF 1915-1919
Col (Later Maj Gen) Sir Robert. S. F. Henderson KCMG, CB 24 July 1915 – 28 March 1919
Maj Gen Sir Donald T. McGavin CMG, DSO, CBE 28 March 1919 – 30 November 1924

Director General of Medical Services
Col Russell Tracey-Inglis CBE, VD 1 December 1924 – 30 November 1929
Col Joseph L. Frazerhurst VD 1 December 1929 – 30 November 1934
Col (Later Maj Gen) Fred T. Bowerbank  OBE, ED 1 December 1934 – 31 March 1947

Director of Medical Services 2nd NZEF
Brig Kenneth MacCormick CB, CBE, DSO, ED 1 October 1940 – 10 May 1942
Brig Harry S. Kenrick CBE, DSO, ED 10 May 1942 – 18 September 1942
Brig Kenneth MacCormick CB, CBE, DSO, ED 18 September 1942 – 17 April 1943
Brig Harry S. Kenrick CBE, DSO, ED 17 April 1943 – 22 May 1945
Brig George W. Gower CBE, ED 22 May 1945 – 11 October 1945

Deputy Director of Medical Services 2nd NZEF
Col Francis B. Edmundson OBE 11 October 1945 – 10 February 1946

Assistant Director of Medical Services 2nd NZEF
Col Harry S. Kenrick CBE, DSO, ED 1 October 1940 – 9 May 1942
Col Patrick A. Ardagh CBE, DSO, MC 10 May 1942 – 16 February 1943
Col Frederick P. Furkert CMG 16 February 1943 – 15 June 1943
Col Russell D. King CBE, DSO 15 June 1943 – 3 December 1944
Col Russell A. Elliot OBE, ED 3 December 1944 – 11 October 1945

Senior Medical Officer 2nd NZEF
Lt Col Victor T. Pearse 11 October 1945 – 31 December 1945

Consultant Physician 2nd NZEF
Col James R. Boyd CBE, MC 10 February 1941 – 22 February 1945
Col Jack D. Cottrell OBE 22 February 1945 – 26 May 1945

Consultant Surgeon 2nd NZEF
Col Sir Thomas D. M. Stout KT, CBE, DSO, ED 10 February 1941 – 13 August 1945

No. 1 NZ General Hospital was originally established in Egypt as the No. 2 NZ Stationary Hospital. Late it was moved to England on the New Zealand Hospital Ship Marama, in June 1916. After the unit has disembarked, it was deployed to Brockenhurst in the New Forest where it took over a hospital originally built for an Indian Division.

Commanding Officers of No. 1 NZ General Hospital Brockenhurst 31 July 1916-1919
Lt Col E. J. O'Neil CMG, DSO, VD 1916-1918

(Still researching this section)

Commanding Officers of st NZ General Hospital 1940-1945
Col A. C. McKillop  12 June 1940 – 10 June 1941
Lt Col T. D. M. Stout (Later Colonel Sir T. D. M. Stout KT, CBE, DSO, ED) 10 June 1941 – 10 August 1941- Acting
Col D. Pottinger MC 10 August 1941 – 11 August 1944
Col W. B. Fisher 11 August 1944 – 24 February 1945
Col D. G. Radcliffe 24 February 1945 – 3 November 1945

No. 2 NZ General Hospital started its life, in New Zealand, as the New Zealand War Contingent Hospital. It opened its doors at Mount Felix, Walton-on-Thames on the 31st of July 1915.

Commanding Officers of No. 2 NZ General Hospital Walton-upon-Thames 31 July 1915-1919
Lt Col T. Mill CMG, CBE 1916-1917
Lt Col E. J. O'Neil, CMG, DSO, VD 1918-1919

No. 2 NZ General Hospital was dis-established in 1919

Commanding Officers of 2nd NZ General Hospital 1940-1945
Lt Col F. M Spencer OBE, ED 1940-1943
Col H. K. Christie CBE, ED 1943-1944
Col I. S. Wilson OBE, MC and Bar, ED 1944-1945
Col H. D. Robertson MBE 1945-1945
Lt Col A. W. Owen-Johnston ED 1945-1945

2nd NZ General Hospital was dis-established in 1945

Commanding Officers of 3rd NZ General Hospital 1940-1946
Col G. W. Gower CBE, ED 24 October 1940 – 22 May 1945
Col J. E. Caughey 22 May 1945 – 17 October 1945
Lt Col C. R. Burns 17 October 1945 – 9 January 1946

Commanding Officers of 4th NZ General Hospital 1940-1940
Lt Col E. L. Button 31 July 1940 – 9 September 1940
Lt Col H. S. Kenrick 9 September 1940 – 1 October 1940

Commanding Officers of 5th NZ General Hospital 1944-1945
Lt Col D. G. Radcliffe 1 April 1944 – 20 February 1945
Lt Col H. D. Robertson 20 February 1945 – 11 July 1945

Commanding Officers of 5th NZ General Hospital 1945-1945
Lt Col  K. B. Bridge 23 October 1945 – 12 December 1945

Commanding Officers of the Convalescent Depot 1945-1945
Lt Col N. F. Boag 13 March 1940 – 27 December 1940
Lt Col A. A. Tennent 27 December 1940 – 13 October 1941
Lt Col A. L. de B. Noakes 13 October 1941 – 26 August 1945
Maj J. W. Bartrum 26 August 1945 – 15 January 1945

Commanding Officers of the Haine Hospital (UK) 1945-1945
Lt Col A. A. Lovell 9 April 1945 – 9 October 1945

Commanding Officers of the 4th Field Ambulance 1939-1945
Lt Col J. H. Will 4 October 1939 – 3 September 1940
Lt Col P. V. Graves 3 September 1940 – 13 October 1941
Lt Col A. A. Tennent 13 October 1941 – 2 December 1941
Lt Col R. D. King 8 January 1942 – 12 June 1943
Lt Col J. K. Elliott 12 June 1943 – 30 April 1944
Lt Col F. B. Edmundson 30 April 1944 – 8 December 1944 
Lt Col A. W. Owen-Johnston 8 December 1944 – 16 August 1945

Commanding Officers of the 5th Field Ambulance 1940-1945
Lt Col H. S. Kenrick 10 June 1940 – 26 May 1940
Lt Col J. M. Twhigg 26 May 1940 – 2 December 1941
Lt Col J. D. Cottrell 12 December 1941 – 12 January 1942
Lt Col J. P. McQuilkin 12 January 1942 – 15 December 1943
Lt Col R. A. Elliott 15 December 1943 – 23 June 1944
Lt Col J. M. Coutts 2 July 1944 – 31 May 1945
Lt Col D. P. Kinnedy 5 June 1945 – 8 October 1945

Commanding Officers of the 6th Field Ambulance 1940-1945
Lt Col W. H. B. Bull 14 May 1940 – 6 May 1941
A/Lt Col J. L. R. Plimmer 6 May 1941 – 20 May 1941
Maj W. B. Fishing (Acting) 22 May 1941 – 16 June 1941
Lt Col N. C. Speight 16 June 1941 – 2 December 1941
Maj R. A. Elliott (Acting) 15 December 1941 – 24 January 1942
Lt Col F. P. Furkert 24 January 1942 – 16 February 1943
Lt Col W. B. Fisher 22 February 1943 – 31 July 1944
Lt Col W. Hawksworth 31 July 1944 – 18 June 1945
Lt Col F. B. Edmundson 18 June 1945 – 8 October 1945

Commanding Officers of the Mobile Surgical Unit 1941-1942
Maj F. P. Furkert 2 June 1941-17 January 1942
Lt Col P. A. Ardagh 18 January 1942 – 27 February 1942

Commanding Officers of the 1st Mobile Casualty Clearing Station 1942-1945
Lt Col P. A. Ardagh 27 February 1942 – 10 May 1942
Lt Col L. J. Hunter 10 May 1945 – 8 October 1943
Lt Col E. L. Button 8 October 1943 – 29 June 1944
Lt Col A. G. Clark 29 June 1944 – 6 August 1945
Lt Col A. W. Owen-Johnton 6 August 1945 – 13 October 1945

Commanding Officers of 2nd NZ General Hospital 1948-1975
Lt Col E. L. Button OBE, ED 1948-1953
Lt Col M. Williams ED 1953-1955
Lt Col D. A. Ballantyne 1955-1958
Lt Col R. C. S. Dick 1958-1962
Maj G. P. Hallwright 1962-1963
Lt Col C. M. Luke 1964-1965
Lt Col A. W. Beasley CNZM, OBE 1965-1969
Lt Col R. T. Aldrige 1969-1971
Lt Col P. N. Leslie OBE, ED 1971-1975

2nd NZ General Hospital was renamed

Commanding Officers of 2nd NZ (GH) Field Hospital 1975-1990
Lt Col P. N. Leslie OBE, ED 1975-1977
Lt Col R. B. W. Smith 1977-1980
Lt Col M. A. B. Allan 1980-1983
Lt Col G. T. Martin 1983-1986
Lt Col A. Thurston 1986-1990

The 1st Medical Support Team transitioned into 2nd NZ Field Hospital.

Commanding Officers of the 1st Medical Support Team 1987-1990
Lt Col D. Roseveare 1987-1989
Lt Col J. R. Gardner 1989-1990

Commanding Officers of 2nd NZ (GH) Field Hospital 1990-2004
Lt Col D. M. A. Thurston 1990-1991
Lt Col G. H. Jull ED RNZDC 1991-1994
Lt Col D. LePage 1994-1998
Lt Col Ma. Shaab RNZNC 1998-1999
Lt Col B. Hewson 1999-2001
Lt Col P. Curran 2001-Dec 2003
Lt Col E. Williams 2003-2004

2nd NZ (GH) Field Hospital was dis-established and renamed

Commanding Officers of 2nd NZ Health Support Battalion 2004-2015
Lt Col E. Williams 2004-2005
Lt Col O. Kaihu 2005-2008
Lt Col P. Hanrahan 2008-2011
Lt Col W. (B.) Twiss 2011-2013
Lt Col D. Beck 2013-2015

Commanding Officers of Joint Operation Health Group 2015-2017
Lt Col S. Halligan, RNZAMC-December 2015-December 2016

Commanding Officers of Deployable Health Organisation 2017-Current
Lt Col J. Hutchings, RNZIR-December 2016-January 2018
Lt Col P. King, RNZE-January 2018-December 2019
Lt Col T. Downey, RNZALR-December 2019-December 2021
Lt Col    McMillan, RNZAMC-December 2021-Current

Current training 
Medical training for the entire New Zealand Defence Force is conducted at the Defence Health School which is located at Burnham Army Camp. All medics enlisted in the Army, Navy or Air Force are sent there for training. The medic training is conducted in two phases; Military Medical Technician and Medic. Within these two phases, students complete a Primary Health Care Phase and an Operational Phase. Each phase comprises an academic component and on the job experience. On the job experience is conducted at various camps, ships and bases within the NZDF. This is a total of two-and-a-half years of intensive training. After their training, medics are then posted to their respective camps and bases. Most gain overseas operational experience with the NZDF within a short time and become proficient and experienced across a wide range of pre-hospital environments. Medics can continue onto a range of degree or graduate level qualifications when their workload permits.

The Royal New Zealand Army Medical Corps also employs a wide range of other medical specialists from Doctors through to radiographers, environmental health officers and other health professionals.

Order of precedence

Notes

References 
 Army Headquarters, Medical Section, The first fifty years : a commentary on the development of the Royal New Zealand Army Medical Corps from its inception in 1908, produced by the Medical Section, Army Headquarters. Wellington: 1958.
 C.H. Kidman, A short history of the Royal Army Medical Corps, 1660 to 1918 and, The New Zealand Medical Corps, 1845 to 1945, Wellington, N.Z.: Ministry of Defence?, 1972.
  Part of the 50-part series Official History of New Zealand in the Second World War 1939–45.
 Stout, T. Duncan M., Medical Services in New Zealand and the Pacific(part of The Official History of New Zealand in the Second World War 1939–45), Historical Publications Branch, Wellington: 1958.
 Treanor, Ken, The staff, the serpent and the sword : 100 years of the Royal New Zealand Army Medical Corps, WillsonScott Pub., Christchurch, c2008.

External links
Royal New Zealand Army Medical Corps

Medical Corps
New Zealand Medical
Military units and formations established in 1947
Organisations based in New Zealand with royal patronage